Christophe Carayon is a paralympic athlete from France competing mainly in category T13 middle-distance events.

Christophe competed in two Paralympics winning two golds and two bronzes.  His first games in 1992 Summer Paralympics gave him his two gold medals in the 800m and 1500m and a bronze in the 400m.  The other bronze came in the 1996 Summer Paralympics where he won the bronze in the 1500m but couldn't medal in the 5000m.

References

External links 
 

Paralympic athletes of France
Athletes (track and field) at the 1992 Summer Paralympics
Athletes (track and field) at the 1996 Summer Paralympics
Paralympic gold medalists for France
Paralympic bronze medalists for France
Medalists at the 1992 Summer Paralympics
Medalists at the 1996 Summer Paralympics
Living people
Year of birth missing (living people)
Paralympic medalists in athletics (track and field)
French male middle-distance runners
Visually impaired middle-distance runners
Paralympic middle-distance runners
20th-century French people